The Musikpreis der Stadt Duisburg, also Duisburger Musikpreis was established in 1990 by the  for the Promotion of Art and Science. This international music prize is intended to highlight "outstanding achievements in the field of music". The foundation bears the endowment of 10,000 euros associated with the award.

Laureates 
Source:

1990 Nikolai Korndorf and Peter Heyworth
1991 Wolfgang Rihm
1992 Yehudi Menuhin
1993 Beat Furrer
1994 Jürg Baur and Thomas Blomenkamp
1995 Hans Werner Henze
1996 Kurt Horres
1997 Anne-Liese Henle (postum)
1998 Toshio Hosokawa
1999 Krzysztof Penderecki
2000 
2001 Christof Loy
2002 Frank Peter Zimmermann
2003 Gerhard Stäbler
2004 Hans van Manen
2005 Tan Dun
2006 Michael Gielen
2007 Dietrich Fischer-Dieskau
2008 Pina Bausch
2009 Alfred Brendel
2010 Hans Wallat
2011 Jonathan Darlington
2012 Fauré Quartet
2013 Duisburg Philharmonic
2014 Nina Stemme
2015 
2016 Bruno Weil
2017 Fazıl Say
2018 Nicolas Altstaedt
2019 Royston Maldoom
2020 Carolin Widmann
2021 Valer Sabadus
2022

References

External links 
 Köhler-Osbahr-Stiftung zum Preis

German music awards
Awards established in 1990